Moravec's paradox is the observation by artificial intelligence and robotics researchers that, contrary to traditional assumptions, reasoning requires very little computation, but sensorimotor and perception skills require enormous computational resources. The principle was articulated by Hans Moravec, Rodney Brooks, Marvin Minsky and others in the 1980s. Moravec wrote in 1988, "it is comparatively easy to make computers exhibit adult level performance on intelligence tests or playing checkers, and difficult or impossible to give them the skills of a one-year-old when it comes to perception and mobility".

Similarly, Minsky emphasized that the most difficult human skills to reverse engineer are those that are below the level of conscious awareness. "In general, we're least aware of what our minds do best", he wrote, and added "we're more aware of simple processes that don't work well than of complex ones that work flawlessly". Steven Pinker wrote in 1994 that "the main lesson of thirty-five years of AI research is that the hard problems are easy and the easy problems are hard."

By the 2020s, in accordance to Moore's law, computers were hundreds of millions of times faster than in the 1970s, and the additional computer power was finally sufficient to begin to handle perception and sensory skills, as Moravec had predicted in 1976.  In 2017, leading machine learning researcher Andrew Ng presented a "highly imperfect rule of thumb", that "almost anything a typical human can do with less than one second of mental thought, we can probably now or in the near future automate using AI." There is currently no consensus as to which tasks AI tends to excel at.

The biological basis of human skills
One possible explanation of the paradox, offered by Moravec, is based on evolution. All human skills are implemented biologically, using machinery designed by the process of natural selection. In the course of their evolution, natural selection has tended to preserve design improvements and optimizations. The older a skill is, the more time natural selection has had to improve the design. Abstract thought developed only very recently, and consequently, we should not expect its implementation to be particularly efficient.

As Moravec writes:

A compact way to express this argument would be:
 We should expect the difficulty of reverse-engineering any human skill to be roughly proportional to the amount of time that skill has been evolving in animals.
 The oldest human skills are largely unconscious and so appear to us to be effortless.
 Therefore, we should expect skills that appear effortless to be difficult to reverse-engineer, but skills that require effort may not necessarily be difficult to engineer at all.

Some examples of skills that have been evolving for millions of years: recognizing a face, moving around in space, judging people's motivations, catching a ball, recognizing a voice, setting appropriate goals, paying attention to things that are interesting; anything to do with perception, attention, visualization, motor skills, social skills and so on.

Some examples of skills that have appeared more recently: mathematics, engineering, games, logic and scientific reasoning. These are hard for us because they are not what our bodies and brains were primarily evolved to do. These are skills and techniques that were acquired recently, in historical time, and have had at most a few thousand years to be refined, mostly by cultural evolution.

Historical influence on artificial intelligence
In the early days of artificial intelligence research, leading researchers often predicted that they would be able to create thinking machines in just a few decades (see history of artificial intelligence). Their optimism stemmed in part from the fact that they had been successful at writing programs that used logic, solved algebra and geometry problems and played games like checkers and chess. Logic and algebra are difficult for people and are considered a sign of intelligence. Many prominent researchers assumed that, having (almost) solved the "hard" problems, the "easy" problems of vision and commonsense reasoning would soon fall into place. They were wrong (see also AI winter), and one reason is that these problems are not easy at all, but incredibly difficult. The fact that they had solved problems like logic and algebra was irrelevant, because these problems are extremely easy for machines to solve.

Rodney Brooks explains that, according to early AI research, intelligence was "best characterized as the things that highly educated male scientists found challenging", such as chess, symbolic integration, proving mathematical theorems and solving complicated word algebra problems. "The things that children of four or five years could do effortlessly, such as visually distinguishing between a coffee cup and a chair, or walking around on two legs, or finding their way from their bedroom to the living room were not thought of as activities requiring intelligence."

In the 1980s, this would lead Brooks to pursue a new direction in artificial intelligence and robotics research. He decided to build intelligent machines that had "No cognition. Just sensing and action. That is all I would build and completely leave out what traditionally was thought of as the intelligence of artificial intelligence." He called this new direction "Nouvelle AI".

Similarly, successful 21st century AI applications don't simulate step-by-step "intelligent" problem solving, they simulate the fast, "intuitive" judgements people use to instantly and automatically recognize patterns and anomalies.

Reception
Linguist and cognitive scientist Steven Pinker considers this the main lesson uncovered by AI researchers. In his 1994 book The Language Instinct, he wrote:

See also
AI effect
Embodied cognition
 History of artificial intelligence
 Subsumption architecture

Notes

References

Bibliography

 
 
 
 
 
 
 
 , p. 456.

External links
 Explanation of the XKCD comic about Moravec's paradox

Philosophy of artificial intelligence
Paradoxes